Ángela María Espinosa (born 4 January 1974) is a Colombian fencer. She competed in the women's individual épée events at the 2000 and 2004 Summer Olympics.

References

External links
 

1974 births
Living people
Colombian female épée fencers
Olympic fencers of Colombia
Fencers at the 2000 Summer Olympics
Fencers at the 2004 Summer Olympics
Sportspeople from Cali
21st-century Colombian women